The 2017 São Tomé (Island or Regional) First Division was the competition of the Santomean Football Federation's São Tome section that took place that season.  The club had 12 clubs. the competition began in 22 April and finished on 29 October. Geographically all clubs that took part in the Premier Division were in the east and almost all but UDRA were in the northeast where the regional and national capital is located. UDRA won their second and recent title (their next title in three years) and almost a month later headed to the national champions to win their national title.

Overview
A total of 132 matches were played and 362 goals were scored, more than half than last season.

UD Correia and UDESCAI were relegated from the Premier Division as they finished in the last two positions. Sporting São Tomé and 6 de Setembro were champions of the Second Division and were promoted into the division for the following season and will participate.

Sporting Praia Cruz scored the most goals numbering 49, second was UDRA with 47. third was Bairros Unidos and fourth was Trindade with 38. On the opposites, UDESCAI conceded the most with 45 followed by Inter Bom-Bom with 42 and 7th placed Trindade and 10th placed Agrosport with 41.

Teams

Championship table

Statistics
Highest scoring match and biggest win: UDESCAI 0-8 Porto Folha Fede (October 29)

References

Football competitions in São Tomé and Príncipe
Sao Tome
Sao Tome
Sao Tome First Division